Thokozani Langa (born 9 February 1972) is a Maskandi musician from Mahlabathini, Kwa-Zulu Natal, South Africa.

Langa signed with Bula Music in 2004 to release his third studio album I-Protection Order (2011). After receiving exposure on national radio and the traditional South African music program Ezodumo, he was nominated for SAMA for both his albums Ipeni Nephepha (2005) and Lishonil' Ilanga (2006), in the category of Best Maskandi Album and Best Mbaqanga Album respectively, alongside The Soul Brothers and Bhekumuzi Luthuli.

Langa was engaged for some time in a musical rivalry with fellow Maskandi singer Bhekumuzi Luthuli. The dispute is the subject of Langa's album entitled Phuma Kimi, released in 2007, which won the SATMA award for Best Male Artist in September that year.
In 2020, he won Best Maskandi Album award at the SAMA.

Early life
Grew up in Mahlabathini, Ulundi, KwaZulu Natal in South Africa. Growing up Thokozani Langa become leader of boys group that performed songs and dance to entertain villagers mainly on Christmas times. He was even recognised and appointed to be boys general ( igoso labafana). He liked music since then, however he was not dreaming to be a maskandi artist but Mbaqanga artist. He said listen to Bhekumuzi Luthuli's songs made him want to try maskandi because it had a bit of Mbaqanga and also maskandi he likes it. He still to this time maintain this unique style among fellow maskandi artists.

Career

discography

Studio albums
 Ipeni ne phepha (2005)
 Lishonile ilanga (2006)
 Phuma kimi (2007)
 I-Protection Order (2011)
 Nganginemali (2012)
 Inyakanyaka (2013)
 Sathanda Ifamily (2014)
 Inganekwane (2014)
 Khozeka Mchana (2015)
 Amabrazo (2016)
 Isiqalekiso (2017)
 Upopayi (2019)
 Iqatha Eliziqobayo (2020)
 Idayimani (2021)
  Iskhiye se coldroom (2022)

Awards and nominations

External links
Biography and Catalogue at Bula Music:

References

1972 births
Maskanda musicians
Living people